The year 1560 in science and technology included a number of events, some of which are listed here.

Events
 The first scientific society, the Academia Secretorum Naturae, is founded in Naples by Giambattista della Porta.

Astronomy
 August 21 – A total solar eclipse is observable in Europe.

Biology
 The Old Botanical Garden, Zurich, originates as Conrad Gessner's private herbarium.

Births
 January 17 – Gaspard Bauhin, Swiss botanist (died 1624)
 June 25 – Wilhelm Fabry, German surgeon (died 1634)
 undated – Charles Butler, English beekeeper (died 1647)
 approx date
 Thomas Harriot, English ethnographer, astronomer and mathematician (died 1621)
 Hugh Myddelton, Welsh-born goldsmith and hydraulic engineer (died 1631)

Deaths
 William Shakespeare's grandfather; Richard Shakespeare died from natural causes, on 23 April.
 November 15 − Domingo de Soto, Spanish priest and philosopher.

References

 
16th century in science
1560s in science